Virtual School Victoria  (formerly Distance Education Centre Victoria) is an F-12 school in Thornbury, Victoria. With an annual enrolment in excess of 4000 students from F-Year 12, VSV is the largest state government school in Victoria. It shares a building with the Victorian School of Languages.

The school is split into two sub-schools:
F-10 sub-school, which handles students from Foundation to Year 10;
Year 11/12 sub-school, which handles students from Years 11 and 12 (including VCE and VCAL).

Work
The school uses blended learning, a mix of virtual and face-to-face teaching and learning. Students can visit the school during normal school hours to meet with teachers, attend seminars and study in the library or purpose-built study areas. School-assessed coursework and other testing material is typically mailed out to students whilst end of year exams and GAT are held on-site under staff supervision.

See also
 Distance education
 E-learning
 Educational technology

Notes

External links
VSV Home Page

Alternative schools
Public high schools in Melbourne
Public primary schools in Melbourne
Distance education institutions based in Australia
Buildings and structures in the City of Darebin